Whiteford may refer to:

Places
United Kingdom
Whiteford House, Cornwall
Whiteford Sands, Wales
Whiteford Lighthouse
Whiteford National Nature Reserve

United States
Whiteford (Price) Archeological Site, Kansas
Whiteford, Maryland
Whiteford Township, Michigan
Whiteford Agricultural Schools

Other uses
 Whiteford (surname)
 Whitford (disambiguation)